Lambeth Central was a parliamentary constituency in the London Borough of Lambeth, in South London.  It returned one Member of Parliament (MP) to the House of Commons of the UK Parliament (using first-past-the-post voting).

The seat, centred on Clapham, was created for the February 1974 general election, and abolished for the 1983 general election, when most of its territory was transferred to the redrawn Vauxhall constituency.

Media coverage
This short-lived seat is best known in the news media for the by-election of 1978.  This was controversial because of a high-profile campaign by the National Front in one of the most racially diverse constituencies in the UK; the party fielded a candidate in the following general election also.  On both occasions the candidates lost their deposits for want of votes.

Boundaries
The London Borough of Lambeth wards of Angell, Clapham Town, Ferndale, Larkhall, and Town Hall.

Members of Parliament

Elections

Notes

References 

Parliamentary constituencies in London (historic)
Constituencies of the Parliament of the United Kingdom established in 1974
Constituencies of the Parliament of the United Kingdom disestablished in 1983
Politics of the London Borough of Lambeth